Chorley is a civil parish in the unitary authority of Cheshire East and the ceremonial county of Cheshire, England. The parish itself contains no large settlement, but there is a small hamlet called Row-of-Trees in the north of the parish. According to the 2001 census, the population of the parish was 399, increasing to 496 at the 2011 Census (called Wilmslow West and Chorley).

Until the arrival of the railway, much of the area now known as Alderley Edge was called Chorley. As well as remaining the name of the civil parish, the name Chorley is also retained in the 14th century Chorley Old Hall, to the south-west of Alderley Edge

The first written evidence of the settlement, then known as 'Chorlegh', appeared in the 13th century, with the likely derivation coming from ceorl and leah, meaning a peasants' clearing. Although it is not mentioned in the Domesday Book, it is included in a charter of c.1280. In the 13th century and during the Middle Ages, the area comprised estates that had many different owners. From the 15th century, most of these farming estates came under the ownership of the de Trafford family.

In 1830 Chorley consisted of only a few cottages, the De Trafford Arms Inn, a toll bar, and a smithy, straggling along the Congleton to Manchester Road.

The coming of the railway in 1842 with the construction of the Stockport to Crewe section of the main Manchester and Birmingham Railway changed all this. The Manchester and Birmingham Railway Company built the line through Chorley, offering free season tickets for 20 years to Manchester businessmen who built houses with a rateable value of more than £50 within a mile of the station. This 'season ticket' was in the form of a small silver oval which could be worn on a watch chain.

The railway also gave Alderley Edge its current name. As the railway network expanded and travel became easier, the railway company did not want its station called Chorley any more because of the possible confusion with Chorley in Lancashire. So, in 1880 they renamed it Alderley Edge against much opposition, taking the old name for the village and the name of the sandstone escarpment already known as The Edge.

See also

Listed buildings in Chorley, Alderley

References

External links

Villages in Cheshire
Civil parishes in Cheshire